Paul Robinson is a fictional character from the Australian television soap opera Neighbours, a long-running serial drama about social life in the fictional Melbourne suburb of Erinsborough. He is played by Stefan Dennis. Paul was created by producer Reg Watson as one of Neighbours' original characters. He debuted in the first episode of the show broadcast on 18 March 1985 and is the sole remaining original cast member. Paul appeared on a regular basis until 1992 when Dennis quit Neighbours to pursue work elsewhere. He reprised the role for a guest appearance in 1993. Dennis returned to the show full-time in 2004 and has since remained in the role. Dennis viewed his decision to leave Neighbours as a mistake.

Early character development during 1980s episodes changed Paul into a powerful, arrogant and sometimes villainous businessman. Paul has an evil persona which has long been admired by Dennis for the entertainment value it creates. In 2007, Paul's evil ways were mellowed through a brain tumour story which brought the character in line with producer's vision of reinventing the show. The character has been used to play various stories ranging from money laundering, a leg amputation to being held hostage and incarceration for crimes. He is often portrayed concocting scams against fellow characters. As a prominent character, Neighbours writers designed their 6000th episode around Paul. The story was dubbed "Who Pushed P.R.?" and Paul was pushed from a mezzanine by an unseen assailant. The character's attack created a long-running whodunit mystery. Paul has had six marriages and countless affairs, which has gained him notoriety as a womaniser. Paul's evil character and womanising have been well received by critics of the genre who were entertained. The actor has garnered various award nominations for his portrayal of Paul.

Casting
In 1984, Stefan Dennis received a phone call from his agent who told him about an audition for a new soap called Neighbours. Dennis said "I wasn't that keen because I was more interested in a feature film I had auditioned for and felt sure I was going to get". Dennis originally auditioned for the roles of Shane Ramsay and Des Clarke (the roles were later given to Peter O'Brien and Paul Keane respectively), but was cast as Paul Robinson instead. Neighbours was cancelled by Seven Network seven months after its debut. However, it was revived by Network Ten and Dennis reprised his role as Paul from January 1986 onwards. He is the only current cast member who appeared in the first episode on 18 March 1985.

Development

Characterisation

Paul was originally the quiet member of his family and had worked as an air steward. Paul's failed marriage to Terry Inglis (Maxine Klibingaitis) altered his personality and he became self-centred. Network Ten publicity assessed that it turned him "bitter and cynical". He worked to become a powerful businessman managing the Lassiters complex and developed many overpowering traits which left him viewed by others as a money-grabbing control freak. But the character was not left without kindness and shared his more generous moments with his grandmother Helen Daniels (Anne Haddy). He has been described as having the ability to notice talent in others, employing those who shared his ambition and nous.

Portrayed for most of his tenure as a deceiving villain, Paul can often be viewed participating in unpredictable stories. This arbitrary nature led Dennis to proclaim "he's a character you never get bored with. Even during times when storylines aren't centred on my character, the writers still come up with little twists for him all the time." Network Ten branded Paul a high flying business man who enjoyed womanising until he met Gail Lewis (Fiona Corke). Other labels the character has are "lothario" and "serial cheat" because of his ill-treatment of the opposite sex. Upon his 2004 return he was portrayed stuck in his old ways. The writer added Paul was committing dodgy deals and deceiving his neighbours in a bid for revenge. The character despises pity, has a damaged personality and can never be faithful to a romantic partner. Dennis branded Paul as "Mr. Evil" because of Paul's harsh treatment of women, observing that his character treated them like toys, throwing them away when he was bored.

When producers realised that Paul's behaviour had gone too far, they considered killing him off. Dennis commented "As an actor, I had the best time because this character just got more evil and more sneaky, more of a cad and a womaniser and it just escalated where it got to the point where it just got silly. It was ridiculous for the supposed reality of the show." The actor also said that he accepted the producers' decision to kill his character off when they explained that they did not know where to take him. However, the show's then executive producer Ric Pellizzeri decided to save the character and redeem him by giving him a brain tumour. Following the removal of the brain tumour, Paul mellowed in his evil ways. Of Paul's dramatic personality change, Dennis said: "He's changed back to where he was 18 odd years ago. What he has become is the same Paul he was back then when he was a very ambitious young entrepreneur with Lassiters and Robinson Corporation. But the difference now is that he is older and wiser and therefore a lot more shrewd and a lot more careful. Post brain tumor, he is no longer evil, more ruthless than evil. Ruthless with a conscience and emotion."

Although Paul changed his ways to an extent, he still shows signs of being evil. Dennis has stated that he and fellow cast member, Alan Fletcher (Karl Kennedy) purposely portray hints of his former self. Of this Dennis stated: "I like to keep that boiling under the surface so that the audience will always think 'what is he up to next?'. You never quite know if he will burst out into Mr. Evil or stay as the character he is at the moment. Alan Fletcher keeps it alive as well, by always looking out the corner of his eye and thinking 'I just don't trust you!'" Dennis later defended his character to the Birmingham Post after he was branded an evil character, describing him in his early years: "Paul started out as a university student, which people have forgotten, he was studying engineering then, much to his father's disgust, left to join an airline and became a trolley dolly. He later became a bit of a cad but I wouldn't call him a villain. I'd describe him as a bad boy with a conscience". Dennis has also stated that he loves playing Paul as a "baddie", because in his opinion he is so colourful, not just an average bad guy, adding: "He's not just a black and white bad guy, he's a sneaky bastard. He's the smiling baddie".

Relationships
Paul enjoyed a relationship with Terry, he believed he really loved her. She tried to defraud him and later kill him. These events had a knock on effect which plagued his relationship with Gail raising many trust issues. He has been described as "unlucky in love" during his early years in the serial.

During an interview with entertainment website Digital Spy Dennis discussed Paul's later relationships in depth. Paul's relationship with Lyn Scully (Janet Andrewartha) was short lived: he mistreated her but ultimately, in a twist for the character, he did the right thing. Dennis describes this as: "The Lyn story was quite sincere, but he had the good sense on the day of the wedding to tell her that he was no good. So he obviously cared about Lyn, but then she came back and haunted him." His relationship with Rebecca Napier (Jane Hall) at times can be fiery, of this Dennis said: "I want to see Paul and Rebecca be like Angie and Dirty Den. I think Rebecca is capable of that. She plays a fiery character and is a very strong. Paul needs somebody who is absolutely there for him and adores him, but will take no shit from him and stand up and fight as hard as she does."

Paul's relationship with his children is often non-conventional, however he has a close bond with his daughter Elle Robinson (Pippa Black), Dennis describes this, adding: "(She's 'a chip off the old block') and even though Elle annoys Paul sometimes, they are always there for each other. Paul adores his daughter and I think it works both ways."

Relationship with Christina Alessi
Writers created Paul's next relationship with Christina Alessi (Gayle Blakeney) and created problems with their marriage via a pregnancy storyline. Paul carefully plans all aspects of Christina's pregnancy and even test themselves travelling to the maternity hospital. When Christina goes into labour, Paul runs out of petrol en route to the hospital. He is faced with the prospect of helping Christina to give birth at the roadside. Paul manages to secure a lift to the hospital in an ice cream van. Christina gives birth to a boy, Andrew Robinson and Shannon Holmes was selected to play him. The debacle embarrasses Paul, who is usually in control. Blakeney told Donna Hay from What's on TV that "the baby's safe and sound - unlike Paul's image."

Writers decided to focus on Paul's struggles following Andrew's birth. He finds it difficult to adjust to fatherhood and the stress of running his failing business becomes too much. Paul abandons Christina and Andrew, and disappears from Erinsborough. Paul admits himself into a psychiatric care facility to improve his mental health. He then travels to New Zealand where he meets up with his daughter, Amy Williams (Sheridan Compagnino). Paul decides to return to Christina and brings Amy with him. Christina is not impressed with Paul's behaviour and does not get along with Amy. She also proved to herself that she could cope with being a single mother in Paul's absence. Lisa Anthony from BIG! magazine observed Christina and Amy as being "at each other's throats" with Paul caught in the middle of their feud. Paul and Amy also have arguments because she reveals that she does not want to live with Paul. One altercation leaves Amy in hospital after she runs in front of Paul's reversing car and is knocked down. Dennis believed that Amy's arrival was another threat to Paul and Christina's marriage. He told a TVTimes reporter that "Paul can't seem to put a foot right. He cracked up when his business got into hot water. Now he's putting his marriage in danger."

Paul later kisses Christina's twin sister Caroline Alessi (Gillian Blakeney). The kiss occurs when Christina forces Paul to sleep on the sofa. When Caroline checks on him during the night, he mistakes her for Christina and kisses her. Caroline responds and they embrace each other. Dennis predicted that Christina would "go off the rails" if she knew about the kiss. He added that Christina would be "deeply hurt that her husband and her sister had betrayed her." Gillian told Twomey that Caroline is "frightened by her strong feelings for Paul" and she feels "terrible" about them betraying her sister. She similarly told a TVTimes journalist that Caroline is "really drawn to Paul" but also "terribly close" to Christina. This leaves her with a dilemma. Gillian added that Caroline thinks Paul and Christina's marriage could end regardless of her involvement. Caroline has to decide if she is missing an opportunity with Paul. Christina becomes suspicious when Caroline is unable to cope with her guilt and leaves Erinsborough for Italy. Discussing the story's effect on Paul's credibility, Dennis told Chris Twomey from What's on TV that Paul would "look stupid" if his third marriage failed. Dennis also defended Paul's actions because he believed the character's unfaithful actions mislead viewers. He added "Paul's not known for his compassion, he's just a stubborn, chauvinistic man. But underneath all that he has a big heart."

After months of causing drama for his family, Paul decides to change his behaviour to save his marriage. Paul thinks that renewing their wedding vows could help his family remain together. Paul is delighted that Christina forgives him and he begins to plan a secret wedding vow renewal. Dennis told a reporter from TVTimes that "Paul's a desperate man, he knows he's nearly blown it with Christina and he realises just how much he was in danger of losing. Now that things have settled down and now that he and Chrissie have ironed out their differences, he wants to give their marriage a fresh start." Dennis added it was a chance for the couple to "go back to the beginning". Paul enlists the help of Gaby Willis (Rachel Blakely) who pretends to need Christina to model a dress design for one of her clients. She also convinces Christina to wear make-up and lures her to the ceremony. The duo renew their vows in front of family and friends in Ramsay Street. Dennis revealed that the renewal was "one of the most moving" scenes he ever did with Blakeney. Dennis concluded that the restaged marriage "certainly brings Paul and Chrissie closer and seals the bond for their future years together."

While portraying Paul and Christina's romance, Dennis and Blakeney began a relationship together. They lived together, later separated but remained friends. Blakeney believed their break-up did not effect the story, stating that "we're both actors, so we didn't have trouble separating the script from real life."

Departure and reintroduction
In 1992, Dennis quit the role because he no longer felt challenged as an actor. He stated: "I was literally walking through it, I thought 'this is not good for acting, this doesn't keep me fresh at all, time to move on'." Dennis has said that one of his favourite moments was being asked to come back and celebrate Neighbours'''' 2000th episode.

Following an eleven-year hiatus producers asked Dennis to return to Neighbours for the 20th anniversary episodes. However, their talks resulted in Dennis agreeing to return full-time. Alan Dale who played his on-screen father, Jim Robinson helped Dennis to make the decision to return. Dennis has since admitted that he made a mistake quitting Neighbours in 1992. He explained "I was stupid. I thought I was going to go to Hollywood and conquer the world, and I didn't." Dennis' return has made Paul the only original character still appearing on Neighbours. The actor continued to publicise his commitment to staying on the show long-term.

The character was reintroduced during the 2004 series finale. The episode focused on a fire at the Lassiter's complex which destroyed the local pub, hotel, doctor's surgery and coffee shop. Paul's arrival coincided with the fire which made him a suspect. His return forms the end of season cliff-hanger and Australian viewers had to wait months before Paul's return continued on-screen. Dennis told Jason Herbison from Inside Soap that "judging from his first appearance he certainly does look guilty." He teased that Paul is "very enigmatic" and his motives for committing the crime remain unclear. Dennis professed his love for his character's mysterious agenda but noted that Paul had "grown and matured" during his absence. Producer Peter Dodds believed that Paul's return gave his writers numerous stories. He detailed that it allowed the return of other past characters and "kick-started a whole new web of deceit and lies" within the show. He concluded that it has made Neighbours more dramatic ever since. Dennis later revealed that producers Ric Pellizzeri and Dodds almost fired him in 2006. In an interview with Studio 10, Dennis recalled the producers telling him, "We don't know how to do this. We have to fire you for you doing your job so well. It doesn't matter what we've thrown at you as Paul Robinson, you've done it. You've just got your teeth into it and done it. It's our fault. We've actually turned the character into a caricature of what he is and he's just sort of getting a little bit for this, what is supposed to be, a real show about real life."

Izzy Hoyland
The character was paired with fellow resident Izzy Hoyland (Natalie Bassingthwaighte) who shared a deceptive personality with him. This created many stories for both characters as they plotted against their neighbours. Dennis stated "the Paul and Izzy relationship was fantastic, it was very popular. Izzy was an interesting character because she was very emotional and insecure. That's what drove her evil ways. She had a bit of a soulmate in Paul." Dennis believed that the pair could not have worked long-term because they would have destroyed each other.

Izzy was in a relationship with Karl when writers began working on material for the new duo. Karl had been played as the arch-enemy of Paul, as they previously feuded. Izzy faces a problems in her relationship and turns to Paul for romance. Karl spends time away from Izzy leaving her free to conduct her affair. He returns to fight for his partner but nearly catches Izzy in bed with Paul. He leaves an expensive watch behind which Karl finds. Izzy pretends that she has purchased it for Karl and he lauds the accessory over Paul. Fletcher told Herbison (Inside Soap) that Karl is jealous of Paul and relishes the opportunity to show off his gift and boast about Izzy. He was keen for his character to discover Izzy's infidelity so Karl and Paul could have a confrontation. Izzy goes into business with Paul and Karl tries to warn her that Paul is untrustworthy. He is unsuspecting and does not believe Izzy would be attracted to Paul. The story provides insight to Izzy who needs stability from Karl and excitement which Paul provides her.

Leg amputation
One of Paul's main storylines culminated in him having his leg amputated after an accident. The storyline has received some criticism as Paul was shown on different occasions not limping with his false leg. Dennis explained during an interview how the production team helped ensure to make his limp appear more effectively, stating "They made me a splint which actually makes me sort of limp, but keeps my foot rigid so it looks like I actually do have a non-moving piece. One time I did change my leg, as in I swapped it over and limped on the other one to see if anyone noticed." Dennis revealed in May 2011, that he wears a brace on his leg as remembering which leg to limp on was becoming a "little distracting."

Robert's revenge campaign
Paul had been uninvolved in the upbringing of all his children. This provided producers with scope to introduce estranged family members. In 2006, writers devised a long-running storyline in-which Paul's son Robert (Adam Hunter) plans a revenge campaign against his father. Robert's motives for his vendetta stem from Paul not being around while he grew up. Paul was happy that he had triplet children Elle, Robert and Cameron Robinson (also played by Hunter) back in his life. He tries to make amends with Robert and attempts to bond with him unaware that he is being plotted against. Writers decided to mark the show's 5000th episode with the story and Robert takes Paul hostage down a mineshaft. Dennis filmed the scenes in a filthy studio set surrounded by cameras, lighting and crew. He told Herbison (Inside Soap) that he found it difficult to pretend he was trapped underground.

Dennis explained that his character is oblivious to Robert's intentions and believes Robert is taking him on a family camping holiday. When Robert has Paul alone he drugs him and take him to the mineshaft. Robert admits to causing the plane crash which killed the Bishop family, intending Paul, Elle and Izzy to die. Dennis explained that Robert "really goes to town telling Paul what a terrible father he's been and how he's going to pay for it now." Robert gloats about his successful scheming and seals the entrance to the mine leaving Paul for dead. But Katya Kinski (Dichen Lachman) begins to suspect that Robert is mentally ill and it is up to her to convince other residents and save Paul from death. Paul escapes but Katya is next to be kidnapped by Robert because he is infatuated with her. She decides to humour Robert in the hope he will return her to Erinsborough. But Robert discovers that Paul plans to marry his mother Gail. He is unaware that it is a ruse set-up by authorities to arrest him. Katya convinces Robert that they should not leave together because he has a final chance to kill Paul at the wedding.

The sham wedding was originally suggested by Izzy in jest and she is shocked that Paul and Gail organise the nuptials. Dennis explained that Robert's "ultimate goal is to destroy Paul". By giving him a time and place to target Paul they plan to trap him. The pair exchange wedding vows which are not binding. But Robert does not surface which angers Paul. He begins to shout and orders Robert to show up and confront him. Robert is entised by Paul's goading and he approaches his father. Dennis said that the pair have a "massive showdown" and the psychotic character pulls a gun and shoots Paul. Following his latest crimes Robert surrenders and is arrested. The fake wedding provided Paul writers with the chance to explore Paul and Gail's relationship which had served their characters during 1980s episodes of Neighbours. Dennis said that the chemistry that existed in 1987 was still present between the pair. On-screen his relationship with Izzy begins to suffer but the wedding makes Paul remember his past shared with Gail. The actor recalled filming the wedding made him question whether Paul and Gail were still in love. In the episode various character's notice their feelings which angers Izzy. The story ends in tragedy and loss for Paul. Katya accepts a lift from Cameron and their neighbour Max Hoyland (Stephen Lovatt) spots Katya in the car. Max mistakes Cameron for Robert and believes Katya is in danger. In an attempt to rescue her Max knocks Cameron over and kills him. Lachman warned that it was the start of a new story in which Paul wants revenge on Max and issues him with a "chilling threat".

Who Pushed P.R.?

In July 2010, it was revealed that Paul would be central to the serial's 6000th episode. Executive producer Susan Bower had hinted previously that the milestone would involve Paul and Alan Fletcher teased audiences with the revelation that something horrible would happen to an iconic character. Of Paul's involvement and the reasoning behind it Bower explained: "As Stefan Dennis – Paul Robinson – was in the first episode 25 years ago, it was decided that his character play a most important role in this very special event [...] Paul Robinson, or P.R as we like to call him, has been up to his usual tricks over the past few weeks and everyone on Ramsay Street is becoming really sick of him. What will they do about it?" It was then announced the plot would be a whodunnit style arc, in which Paul is left fighting for his life after being pushed from the mezzanine level of Lassiter's Hotel.

The episodes were structured with a five episode build up prior to the 6000th episode, a new suspect being revealed in each. UK broadcaster Channel 5 posted an official statement: "With so many enemies, it will be hard to narrow down who had the motive to harm him. Who pushed P.R?". Jane Badler who plays Diana Marshall in the serial compared the storyline to that of the Who shot J.R.? storyline from American soap opera Dallas. On-screen the storyline progresses as new character Mark Brennan (Scott McGregor), tries to solve the mystery.

Cancer misdiagnosis
In 2015, producers decided to explore a false cancer storyline for Paul. The storyline sees Dr Nick Petrides (Damien Fotiou) pretend Paul has cancer in order to help him open up his own cancer treatment centre. The storyline was first teased by the serial's executive producer, Jason Herbison, during the show's 30th anniversary. He told Digital Spy, "We have a huge storyline for Paul coming out of the 30th week in Australia, involving Dr Nick Petrides. This will play out over a period of time and will see Paul at his most vulnerable." Herbison teased that Paul would make "big, irreversible decisions which will have a big bearing on his future." Fotiou had also initially said of his character before the storyline's unravelling, "His intentions are certainly noble, however all is not what it appears, and I love the way the story unfolds - there's a lot of surprises." Dennis branded it a "massive storyline" that continues for a "significant amount of time". Dennis revealed that director and former cast member Scott Major was "gobsmacked" upon seeing the false diagnosis. Dennis called the plot a "big, big journey" for Paul that will enable viewers to "a very, very different side of Paul". He added that Paul will take fans"on a rollercoaster. We will see a dark and very vulnerable side of him."

During a blood drive, Paul donates his blood and Nick alters the results of his blood test to indicate signs of leukaemia cancer after he is "initially furious" at Paul's discontinued support of his cancer centre. Paul is then delivered some "devastating news" from Nick, who tells him he has cancer. The storyline was used as a plot device for producers to reintroduce Paul's daughter, Amy (now Zoe Cramond), as Paul tries to contact her to inform her that he is dying. The storyline also coincided with Dennis' decision to shave his head for the Australian Childhood Foundation, which was "weaved seamlessly" into the plot as Paul decides to shave his head during his chemotherapy. Dennis said of having short hair, "This is freakishly short for me and I now can’t complain about having a bad hair day now. Now that I have the look, my ambition is for Paul to take on Walt in Breaking Bad." A writer from Tenplay also reported that the writers were initially panicked by Dennis' shortened hair, but the costume department had been "spending up big on hats" for Paul. Nick is eventually caught out after "the truth slowly begins to unravel" and he is sent to prison.

Character reflection
In 2022, it was announced that Channel 5 had cancelled the production of Neighbours. Dennis admitted that filming the final scenes of 2022 were "incredibly emotional" for him. He told Studio 10 on 10 June, "It's a melancholy day for me. I sort of closed the studio door behind me on my very last scene, my very last dialogue scene and, yeah, I suddenly surprised myself by getting incredibly emotional. I just kept to myself and went to my dressing room… I'm keeping a very low profile today. I think I'll just be an absolute mess if I sort of hang around too long." Dennis later wrote a piece on The Sydney Morning Herald, reflecting on his "life as Paul Robinson, Australia’s longest-running TV villain." He wrote, "For some time I have joked with family and friends that my job is to go to a workplace and spend the day pretending to be someone else. After the chuckling subsides, I reflect on the fact that pretending to be 'Paul Robinson' on Neighbours over nearly 40 years has been one of the greatest privileges in my life. If you had told me in 1985 that I would be playing the same character on a soap for most of my days, I would have laughed maniacally (with that laugh, maybe “Paul” was there already) and, yet, here I am, the physical home of possibly the best loved and longest serving villain in Oz television history." He continued, "In fact, in the late ’80s I was dubbed “The Junior JR”, which I wore as a bit of a badge. One would think living with this dastardly character would create all sorts of problems for me in the real world, but it’s always the opposite. Rather than booing, hissing and stone throwing, I’m normally met with “Hey Paul … legend!” Funny old world, isn’t it. It is a rare thing for a professional actor to be gainfully employed for most of their life. Though it’s fairly well known that I left the show and returned 12 years later as the same character, it was directly on the back of my profile from Neighbours that I was able to get consistent high-profile work in the UK for all of those 12 years. Many, too, have rocketed to global superstardom from that wonderful training ground, among them Kylie Minogue, Guy Pearce, Russell Crowe and Margot Robbie." Dennis recapped his character by saying, "Paul’s nefarious deeds are many: he tried to poison Erinsborough’s drinking waterways, he set fire to Lassiters and killed Gus Cleary in the process, attempted to bulldoze Ramsay Street and everything in it, and, horror of horrors, blew up a beautiful 1960s convertible E-type Jaguar. That’s not even to mention his six marriages. He is the villain we all love to hate." He also expressed his gratitude for the soap.

Storylines
1985–1993
Paul is the eldest child of Jim Robinson and his wife Anne. His half sister Julie (Vikki Blanche; Julie Mullins) was born the year afterward followed by brother Scott (Darius Perkins; Jason Donovan), half brother Glen (Richard Huggett) and finally his youngest sister Lucy (Kylie Flinker; Sasha Close; Melissa Bell). Anne died giving birth to Lucy, when Paul was only twelve and Paul's grandmother, Helen moved into the Robinson house to help Jim with the children. Paul was her self-confessed favourite.

Paul marries Terry Inglis after a whirlwind relationship. However, Terry shoots Paul when he finds out she killed her ex-boyfriend and she goes on the run. Terry is eventually arrested and later commits suicide in prison. Paul meets Gail Lewis for the second time, having worked with her previously, when she applies for a job at the Daniels Corporation. They both agree to enter into a marriage of convenience in order to secure a business agreement, but soon develop genuine feelings for each other and they renew their vows. That same year Paul learns that he has fathered a child, Amy (Nicolette Minster), with Nina Williams (Leigh Morgan).

Gail becomes convinced that Paul will lose interest in IVF treatment or adoption, but Paul becomes more committed to having children with her. After IVF treatment, Gail becomes pregnant with triplets, however, Paul starts working hard and becomes detached from Gail. After the death of her father Rob Lewis (Ernie Bourne), Gail decides to leave him and move to Tasmania where she gives birth to Elle, Robert and Cameron. The couple later divorce. Paul faces financial troubles when Hilary Robinson (Anne Scott-Pendlebury) withdraws her funding of the Daniels Corporation.

Paul leases his house to twin sisters Christina and Caroline. Christina falls in love with Paul and after a short romance and a quick engagement, the couple marry. Shortly after, Christina becomes pregnant and gives birth to a son, Andrew. Paul suffers a nervous breakdown and cheats on Christina with Caroline. The couple eventually reunite and they leave to manage a branch of Lassiter's in Hawaii. Paul later returns to the street where he gets his brother-in-law, Philip Martin (Ian Rawlings), involved in a fraud scandal. Paul then flees to Brazil and asks Christina to join him. He returns for Helen's birthday, but the celebration is ruined when he is forced to flee the country on fraud charges. Paul returns to Australia after the death of Helen and is sentenced to seven years' imprisonment, of which he serves three.

2004–
Paul returns to Erinsborough and sets fire to the Lassiter's complex. He also kills Gus Cleary (Ben Barrack), when Gus catches him. Paul helps rebuild the complex and reclaims Lassiter's for himself. Paul has affairs with both Izzy Hoyland and Liljana Bishop (Marcella Russo). He later frames Liljana's husband, David (Kevin Harrington) for fraud. Paul strikes a deal with Affirmacon to build on Ramsay Street and he gets his protégé Dylan Timmins (Damien Bodie) to pollute the local wetlands. When Paul wants to pull out of the deal, he is taken to the bush and beaten up. Paul escapes and falls down a cliff, badly breaking his leg. While Paul recovers in hospital, his leg becomes infected and is amputated. Paul's sister, Lucy, encourages him to make a proper home for himself in Erinsborough and he moves into Number 22. Paul begins a relationship with Izzy and his estranged daughter Elle moves in. To celebrate the Lassiter's Hotel 20th anniversary, Paul and several of his neighbours go on a joy flight to Tasmania. During the flight, a bomb explodes causing the plane to crash into the sea. Paul, Izzy and Elle survive.

Paul's son, Robert, arrives in the guise of his twin, Cameron. Robert alienates Paul from everyone, before drugging and trapping him in an old mineshaft. Robert confesses to planting the bomb on the plane and sending a poisoned letter to Paul. Robert collapses the entrance to the mine and leaves Paul to die. Paul is eventually rescued and he is grows closer to Gail when she returns to town. Paul and Gail hold a fake wedding to lure Robert out of hiding and he shoots Paul, who survives due to a bullet proof vest. Paul goes on a downward spiral and flirts with several women, attempts to blackmail Carmella Cammeniti (Natalie Blair) and betrays Lyn Scully. When Max accidentally kills Cameron, Paul decides to shoot Max in revenge, but he is talked out of it. Paul begins a relationship with Lyn and they become engaged. However, after kissing Rosetta Cammeniti (Natalie Saleeba) in the lead up to the wedding, Paul admits to Lyn that he cannot be faithful to her just minutes after they marry. Having sold half of Lassiter's, keeping a 49% share for himself, Paul decides to regain full control. Knowing Oliver Barnes (David Hoflin) owns shares in Lassiter's, Paul tries to break up his relationship with Carmella and get him to date Elle.

Elle manages to convince Paul to sign over his share of Lassiter's to her and she leaves him with nothing. Paul has a brain tumour removed and he loses his memory. He later apologises to his neighbours for all the bad things he did. Paul begins a relationship with Oliver's mother, Rebecca Napier, and she and her youngest son, Declan (James Sorensen), move in with him. Remembering that he murdered Gus, Paul confesses all to the police and Gus's sister Laura (Jodi Flockhart). The police inform Paul that they will not be pursuing the case, while Laura and her boyfriend Nick Thompson (Marty Grimwood) try to blackmail Paul by kidnapping Declan. Paul has an affair with Kirsten Gannon (Nikola Dubois) and Rebecca ends their relationship. Paul regains his assets from Elle and he buys the Erinsborough News. Paul briefly dates Cassandra Freedman (Tottie Goldsmith), but he and Rebecca soon reconcile. Paul is initially blamed for his half-sister Jill Ramsay's (Perri Cummings) death. He goes on the run, but his name is cleared by Jill's daughter Sophie (Kaiya Jones). When Paul and Rebecca get engaged, Lyn interrupts their wedding to announce she and Paul are still married. After divorcing Lyn, Paul marries Rebecca.

Paul's youngest son, Andrew (now played by Jordan Patrick Smith), comes to stay with his father. Paul suffers financial difficulties and embezzles money from Lassiter's. He also frames Declan for an accident at a building site, that he himself caused. Diana Marshall comes to Erinsborough to find evidence of Paul's embezzlement. Paul asks her to take over Lassiter's with him and they have sex. Rebecca gives Paul an ultimatum; leave Lassiter's or leave the family. He then hands over management of the hotel to Declan for six months. Paul discovers Diana is working with Declan to remove him from the company and he contacts Rosemary Daniels (Joy Chambers), who fires Diana. Meanwhile, Paul threatens Declan. When Rebecca finds out about Paul's affair and threats towards Declan, she pushes him from the Lassiter's mezzanine. Paul survives and blackmails Rebecca into staying with him, causing their marriage to deteriorate. Rebecca later convinces Paul to sign an affidavit, which states that his fall was an accident, and she leaves him and the country. Paul falls out with local councillor Ajay Kapoor (Sachin Joab) and plots to ruin Ajay's career, after the local police station is closed down and merged with another.

Paul makes sure a house party in Ramsay Street is gatecrashed and then writes an article about how the police were late to the scene because of the merger. Susan Kennedy (Jackie Woodburne) learns Paul sent the gatecrashers to the party and tells the press. Paul is forced to step down as editor. He then hires public relations consultant Zoe Alexander (Simmone Jade Mackinnon) to improve his image. Paul and Zoe briefly date and Paul unsuccessfully tries to get the editor's job back from Susan. Paul's nieces Sophie and Kate (Ashleigh Brewer) move in with him. Paul and Andrew purchase Charlie's bar together and Paul begins an affair with Ajay's wife, Priya (Menik Gooneratne). After Andrew collapses, he tells Paul that he has epilepsy. Paul tries to take Charlie's away from him, but soon relents. Priya ends the affair and Ajay finds out about it. Paul sells the Erinsborough News to fund his plan of turning the top two floors of Lassiter's into apartments. Paul grieves for Priya when she dies after an explosion at a wedding reception on Lassiter's grounds. Ajay files a civil action against Paul and a preliminary police report indicates negligence on Paul's part, but a gas bottle is found to have come from faulty stock.

Paul uses Rhiannon Bates (Teressa Liane) to help him bribe councillor Allan Hewitt (Mick Preston) and Rhiannon reports them to the police. Lucy tells Paul that she has been promoted to head of Lassiter's Worldwide and gets his apartment plans approved. She also hires Terese Willis (Rebekah Elmaloglou) as the new manager of Lassiter's Hotel. Paul is accused of sexual harassment by Caroline Perkins (Alinta Chidzey), but Terese manages to get Caroline to drop the lawsuit by giving her a settlement. Mason Turner (Taylor Glockner) asks for Paul's help when Robbo Slade (Aaron Jakubenko) starts blackmailing him. Paul hires Marty Kranic (Darius Perkins) to take care of Robbo, who is later hit by a car. Paul pays Marty off for services rendered. Jack Lassiter (Alan Hopgood) returns to Erinsborough and warns Paul about putting business before family. Jack confesses to Paul that he is giving his fortune away because he is dying. Paul and Mason believe Marty killed Robbo, but he denies it and then threatens to implicate Paul.

Paul offers to manage Georgia Brooks' (Saskia Hampele) singing career and gets her to sign over the rights to her song. Paul then gives the song to Amali Ward, but she decides against recording it. Paul attempts to sue Georgia, but drops the case when he learns Jack has died. He then asks for his fraud conviction to be removed from his criminal record, so he can run for mayor. Karl unsuccessfully runs against him. Paul seeks to separate the hotel from the Lassiter's chain to enable him to sack Terese. However, Terese quits her job and Paul threatens to sue her. Lucy persuades Paul to re-hire Terese and he keeps the hotel within the Lassiter's chain. Paul learns Rebecca works for a civic project called Twin Cities and forges Karl's signature on a cover letter to get Rebecca to return. Paul tells Rebecca that he became mayor for her because he still loves her. Paul asks Rebecca to move back to Erinsborough, but she refuses. Paul disapproves when Kate gets back together with Mark Brennan. They reconcile just before she is fatally shot. Paul blames Mark for Kate's death.

Paul's nephew, Daniel (Tim Phillipps), arrives in town and agrees to stay with him. Paul re-opens Charlie's and announces that it has been renamed The Waterhole, a name chosen by Kate before she died. After purchasing a painting from Naomi Canning (Morgana O'Reilly), Paul learns from the police that its ownership is disputed. He asks Naomi for his money back, but she tells him she has spent it. Paul then asks Naomi to have sex with him, in exchange for him not pressing charges against her. Naomi blackmails Paul into dropping the charges. Paul and Mark join forces to find Kate's killer. Matt Turner (Josef Brown) informs Paul that Victor Cleary (Richard Sutherland), Gus's younger brother, has become a suspect in Kate's murder. Paul realises that he may be responsible for Kate's death. He buys a gun and meets with Victor who taunts Paul about killing Kate, before Matt and Mark arrive. Mark tackles Paul and Matt arrests Victor. Paul develops depression, knowing that his actions were responsible for Kate's death, and Terese tries to help him. After a public meltdown, Paul is suspended as mayor. He begins volunteering at Sonya's (Eve Morey) garden nursery, while Lucy also helps him overcome his grief.

Sheila Canning (Colette Mann) encourages Paul to start dating again, and he has a number of casual relationships using a dating app. He falls out with Daniel when he puts his romance with Amber Turner (Jenna Rosenow) before work. After they argue, Daniel and Amber go out into a tornado that hits Erinsborough. Paul goes after them and his car is hit by a dislodged skip. Daniel and Amber rescue him. He suffers broken ribs and a cracked prosthetic. Paul decides he is ready to be mayor again and organises a media gathering at Sonya's Nursery, but it has to be postponed when the nursery is vandalised. Paul discovers Jayden Warley (Khan Oxenham) was behind the vandalism, and he blackmails Jayden's mother Sue Parker (Kate Gorman) into stepping down as interim mayor. Dakota Davies (Sheree Murphy), a fling from Paul's time in Brazil, arrives in Erinsborough and tells Paul that he abandoned her without explanation to return to Australia in 2004. Paul's memories of this are unclear due to his brain tumour, but he agrees to help her set up a bar. Paul falls in love with Dakota, but he soon learns that she is involved in diamond smuggling. She leaves after asking him for money.

When Terese goes through a rough patch in her marriage to Brad (Kip Gamblin), Paul arranges her former boss, Ezra Hanley (Steve Nation), to come to Erinsborough, with the intention of breaking up the Willis' marriage. However, Ezra tries to force himself on Terese and is fired from Lassiter's. When he tries to sue Paul and Terese, Paul pays Gary Canning (Damien Richardson) to attack Ezra. When Gary confesses to the police, Paul gives him more money to keep quiet about their arrangement. Paul hires Naomi to organise the Erinsborough Festival, two weeks of events celebrating the suburb. Hilary Robinson returns and convinces Paul to reinstate some of the community services. Paul tries to stop Daniel and Amber's wedding by sending Amber away on a photography trip and planning for her flight to be cancelled, so she will not make the wedding. He also asks Des Clarke to talk to Daniel about the dangers of marrying the wrong person. Imogen Willis (Ariel Kaplan) forces Paul to bring Amber back, but he realises Imogen loves Daniel and tells Amber. Daniel fails to appear for the wedding after he goes looking for Imogen. Paul realises Nina Tucker (Delta Goodrem) is in town and with help from Lou and Karl, he convinces her to sing at the festival's closing concert.

Nick Petrides informs Paul that he has leukaemia and he starts him on a course of chemotherapy. Paul hires Naomi as his assistant and she helps to keep his diagnosis a secret. When Paul collapses, he calls Karl for help and tells him about his diagnosis. Nick tells Paul that his body has stopped responding to the chemotherapy. Paul wants Karl to succeed him as mayor and he asks Naomi to find his daughter Amy. While Naomi is encouraging Paul to be more positive, she kisses him. She apologises, but they both develop feelings for each other. Paul asks Naomi to shave his head when his hair starts falling out, and he sells Lassiter's to the Quill Group. Paul collapses from pneumonia and is hospitalised. Nick tells Paul that his cancer is in remission, but Georgia claims that Paul never had cancer and Nick is found to have doctored Paul's patient files. He is arrested soon after. Paul tries to forget about his feelings for Naomi, by pushing her and Brennan back together. However, Naomi discovers their plan and breaks up with Brennan. The Quill Group sell Lassiter's back to Paul and he and Naomi kiss.

Amy turns up at the penthouse and is angered when Paul does not immediately recognise her. She later introduces Paul to his grandson Jimmy Williams (Darcy Tadich). Paul and Jimmy bond, but when he buys Jimmy expensive presents, Amy returns them. Paul gives Amy a job as his executive assistant, but she quits after making a mistake which costs Lassiter's money. Paul proposes to Naomi and she accepts. After an argument, she has a one-night stand with Josh Willis (Harley Bonner). Paul forgives Naomi and they call off their engagement. He gets revenge on Josh by having someone place illegal peptides in his bag, leading to his good behaviour bond being revoked. Naomi breaks up with Paul and leaves for a job overseas. Paul pays Jimmy's father Liam Barnett (James Beck) to leave town, resulting in Jimmy not wanting to spend time with him. Paul plans to close Erinsborough High and sell the land to Eden Hills Grammar, so he can push through a luxury housing development. Paul's personal emails are sent to the media, showing that he bribed local councillors. He is later fired as mayor and the bank calls in his loans, leaving him in financial difficulty.

Paul gaslights Stephanie Scully (Carla Bonner), as he wants her to leave Erinsborough and stay away from Jimmy. He swaps her medication for psychotropic drugs, which triggers a mental health relapse. After offering to drive her to her doctor, they crash and Steph finds the drugs in his pocket. She blackmails him into giving her a job and money. Paul is forced to liquidate his assets to pay off his debts. The bank sells Lassiter's to the Quill Group and Paul is escorted from the penthouse by the police. Terese invites him to stay with her and they share a kiss, but she then tells him she wants to be friends. Paul plans to start making gazebos in partnership with Amy, but she refuses to go ahead after learning what he did to Steph. Paul purchases a rundown motel with Steph and Doug Willis (Terence Donovan) as investors. He organises a Citizen of the Year event at the motel, but it is stolen by Lassiter's after the motel loses its liquor licence. Paul asks Cecilia Saint (Candice Alley) to sabotage the event. Shortly after, the hotel boiler explodes, injuring Daniel and killing Josh and Doug. While supporting a grieving Terese, admitting to her that he loves her. Paul is arrested for causing the explosion, after he is found to have deleted CCTV footage of himself in the boiler room. Paul maintains his innocence and Steph is the only one who believes him. Paul goes on the run, but he is soon arrested and remanded in custody.

Paul is found guilty and sentenced to eighteen years jail, with a non-parole period of fourteen years. Inside, Paul meets Gary Canning and asks him to provide protection, however, Gary is soon granted parole and Paul is assaulted and hospitalised. He is released when Julie Quill (Gail Easdale) and Jacka Hills (Brad McMurray) confess to causing the explosion. He plans to buy Lassiters, but Terese arranges a successful counter bid. Paul learns he fathered David Tanaka (Takaya Honda) and Leo Tanaka (Tim Kano) with Scott's school friend, Kim Taylor (Jenny Young). David bonds with Paul, although Leo stays away from him due to their business rivalry, but eventually comes to accept Paul as his father. Paul tries to pursue a relationship with Terese, but she rejects him and later gets engaged to Gary. After receiving compensation from the Quill group, Paul buys back the Lassiter's Penthouse. Terese confides in Paul that she has breast cancer, and he does his best to support her. However, once it is obvious that her chemotherapy is not working, Terese visits her brother Nick in prison, who is later granted bail with the help of Clive Gibbons (Geoff Paine), much to Paul's chagrin. Paul soon learns that Amy and Nick are dating. In addition, Steph buys Paul and Leo out of Robinsons to set up a health retreat. Terese receives good news about her cancer, and she and Paul have sex, but she chooses to stay with Gary.

Paul gets Nick's parole revoked by having stolen medication planted in his hotel room, which results in his and Amy's break up. Paul then attempts to end Gary and Terese's relationship by tricking Gary into taking an illegal oyster-fishing job, but Gary rejects the offer and learns Paul tried to set him up. Amy and Jimmy move out, just after Terese makes it clear that she and Paul will never be in a relationship. Paul leaves for New York City, but meets Courtney Grixti (Emma Lane) at the airport and after a few weeks together, they return on Gary and Terese's wedding day. Paul's return results in Terese admitting to Gary that she cheated on him. Terese then goes to see Paul, who announces that he is engaged to Courtney. Paul also buys Mr Udagawa's (Lawrence Mah) share of Lassiters and makes Courtney the hotel's rejuvenation consultant. Paul soon admits that he and Courtney are not in a relationship, and that they just wanted to get revenge on Terese and Courtney's father, Tim Collins. Courtney arranges for them to get married, but they do not go through with it and Courtney reconciles with her father. Gary asks Paul to give him and Sheila alibi's for the night of Hamish Roche's (Sean Taylor) murder, and Paul alters their check in times on the hotel database. Paul invests in the new hospital wing and wins the naming rights. He announces that Amy will be the project manager for his new real estate development, Robinson Heights, without consulting her first. Paul also forces Amy to hire Sue Parker's son, when she threatens to go to the press about an issue with the housing development. Izzy Hoyland returns to Erinsborough and donates $5 million to the hospital wing, giving Karl the naming rights. Rafael Humphreys (Ryan Thomas) attempts to get revenge on Paul for causing the death of his mother in Brazil. Along with Sue, Rafael sabotages the site of the housing development. Paul pays his bail and after they learn Dakota Davies was responsible for his mother's death, Rafael leaves to find her.

Jane Harris returns to Erinsborough and remarks that she acts a lot like her grandmother, Mrs Mangel. Paul and Jane have a drink together and open up about their lives. Jane has to leave when her grandmother dies and Paul gifts her Mrs Mangel's portrait from the hotel. Paul offers to buy Terese out of the hotel, when Gary struggles with their closeness. However, she refuses to sell and Gary later ends their relationship. Paul demotes Leo and forces Terese to mentor him, after learning that he had sex with his assistant Chloe Brennan (April Rose Pengilly). Paul asks for Leo's help in wooing Terese, but her daughter Piper Willis (Mavournee Hazel) learns they are treating Terese like a conquest and tells her. David's fiancé Aaron Brennan (Matt Wilson) asks Paul to be his business mentor, but when Paul takes a look the books for his gym, he realises the business is on the verge of collapse. Paul buys Mishti Sharma's (Scarlet Vas) half of the business and puts pressure on Aaron to improve the gym. At a pre-wedding party, Aaron admits that he hurt his back at the gym and blames Paul. David asks him not to come to the wedding, but later changes his mind when Paul apologises to Aaron. Paul finds Amy and Gary about to kiss and learns that they are a couple. He responds by pushing Gary's food cart into the lake. He later finds Leo and Terese are also together. He throws Leo's clothes over the balcony, fires him as Head of Business Affairs, and gets his backpackers hostel closed down. He later gets Gary fired and punches him.

As Paul struggles with his children's relationships, they, and Terese, invite Jane back to Erinsborough as a distraction for him. Paul and Jane share a kiss after a date, but when she learns about his recent behaviour and that he still has feelings for Terese, she tells him that they are over. Paul explains his actions to Jane, and she encourages him to apologise to his family. Jane and Paul begin their relationship again. After Terese is shot, Paul accidentally admits to Jane that he is still in love with Terese. Jane ends their relationship. After Leo and Terese break up, Paul learns that Terese ended their relationship because she still has feelings for him. Paul and Terese agree to start a relationship in secret, but are quickly caught kissing by Leo, who goes on a downward spiral and tries to get his revenge on the couple. Paul learns that Gary and Amy are engaged. When Amy quits the Robinson Pines project, he hires her former boyfriend and Gary's son Kyle Canning (Chris Milligan) to take over. Paul asks Kyle to break up Amy and Gary, but he refuses. Terese asks Paul to move in with her, but he is reluctant to leave the penthouse. Paul also pays Chloe to pretend to be Amy when trying to woo a potential investor, but they are found out by Amy, Terese and Leo.

Paul agrees to move in with Terese, but their relationship is tested by the arrival of her niece Roxy Willis (Zima Anderson), and Chloe's revelation that Paul paid her to keep away from Kyle, so he could pursue Amy. Paul buys a racehorse from Roxy's boyfriend Vance Abernethy (Conrad Coleby), but Terese persuades him to cancel the deal. Paul and Roxy learn that Terese has kept her past relationship with Vance from them. Terese admits that she was trying to protect Roxy, but Paul hates that she lied to him. In an attempt to show her commitment to their relationship, Terese proposes, but Paul turns her down. Paul learns David is visiting Robert in prison and rushes to stop him. After briefly seeing Robert again, Paul learns that he has a granddaughter Harlow Robinson (Jemma Donovan), who comes to stay with him and Terese. Paul is initially reluctant to discuss Robert with Harlow, but he eventually opens up to her and they bond. Paul then proposes to Terese, who accepts. Roxy attempts to kiss Paul, who pushes her away. Gary also confronts Paul about his plan with Sheila to sabotage his relationship with Amy. Paul is attacked later that night, and Roxy claims Gary is responsible, but she soon reveals that it was Vance.

In the run up to Paul and Terese's wedding, Gail comes to Erinsborough to meet Harlow. She feels Harlow's living situation is not ideal and plans to take her to Tasmania with her, but later changes her mind. Gail's arrival is soon followed by Lyn, who claims to be carrying out interviews for the Retreat. Paul starts to become paranoid that his former wives are plotting to stop the wedding, after Rebecca also arrives in town. She apologises to Paul for pushing him off the mezzanine balcony, and tries to convince Terese to leave Paul, but Terese stands by him. Paul and Terese decide to elope to Queensland, but Paul finds Christina at the same resort and calls off the wedding. Christina's sister Caroline persuades her to tell Paul that Elle is behind the appearances of his former wives. Paul confronts Elle, who explains that she wanted to force him to look at himself and reassess how he has treated his wives. Paul and Terese reconcile and marry at the resort with Christina and Caroline as witnesses. They honeymoon in London, where they meet Harlow's mother Prue Wallace (Denise Van Outen). Upon returning to Erinsborough, Paul and Terese learn that a hidden camera was found in one of the hotel rooms, which Amy and Kyle recently stayed in. Scarlett Brady (Christie Whelan Browne) releases the footage to the press, causing a backlash against the hotel. Terese steps down as general manager and Kyle launches a class action suit against Lassiters. An exhausted Kyle accidentally strikes David with his car one night, resulting in David's hospitalisation. Paul angrily confronts Kyle after he admits he is responsible. David needs a kidney transplant and Harlow asks Robert against Paul's wishes. Robert is a match, but he escapes from the hospital before the surgery. He later hands himself in and David's receives his kidney. Paul visits Robert and thanks him. After breaking up with Kyle, Amy moves to New York indefinitely and she and Paul bid each other a tearful farewell.

When Jane returns to town, it emerges that she has been targeted by a catfish, later revealed to be Mannix Foster (Sam Webb), who once tried blackmailing Paul. Noticing her devastation, he writes an apology letter from Mannix's alias, inadvertently using his wedding vows and angering Terese, though they later reconcile through a vow renewal. Paul invites Des back to Ramsay Street, and is delighted when he and Jane choose to pursue a relationship again. Paul learns that Harlow and her boyfriend Hendrix Greyson (Benny Turland) have run away to Pierce Greyson's (Tim Robards) island. Whilst driving to the jetty to rescue Harlow, he finds Toadie Rebecchi (Ryan Moloney) lying in the sand and learns that he was attacked by Finn Kelly (Rob Mills). Paul and Toadie are picked up and held hostage by Finn's friend Harry Sinclair (Paul Dawber), who eventually allows them to rescue the others, after seeing that Finn has set the island on fire. Paul and Toadie find the others and they are forced to hide in a mineshaft, where Bea Nilsson (Bonnie Anderson), her sister Elly Conway (Jodi Anasta) and Harlow are. Paul comforts Kyle after they learn that Gary was killed by Finn. Upon returning to Erinsborough, Paul discovers that Prue was also killed by Finn, and breaks the news to a devastated Harlow. Harlow repeatedly listens to Prue's final voicemail, until Paul inadvertently deletes it. He also attempts to keep Harlow and Hendrix apart. His relationship with Harlow deteriorates further when it is revealed that he failed to turn Mannix into the police and tried to cover up his robberies. When she attempts to negotiate a fixed weekly schedule of sleep overs at Hendrix's house, Paul refuses to permit this, and Harlow moves out. However, they later reconcile when Harlow realises how much Paul loves her and he accompanies her to a gynaecology appointment. Paul feuds with Hendrix's father Pierce, who has invested in Lassiter's. When he discovers Pierce is having an affair, Paul blackmails him into selling back his share in Lassiter's. He also attempts to force Pierce to leave Erinsborough with Hendrix to break up Harlow's relationship. When Pierce's affair is exposed, Terese and Harlow are furious with his scheming.

Paul protests when Jane's daughter, Nicolette Stone (Charlotte Chimes), offers to act as David and Aaron's surrogate, concerned about her past manipulative behaviour. He is relieved when Harlow breaks up with Hendrix but is even more disapproving of her next choice of boyfriend, Brent Colefax (Texas Watterston). Nicolette and Brent ally themselves against Paul, further deepening his dislike of them. When Brent is arrested for robbery, Paul pays Holden Brice (Toby Derrick) to implicate Brent and get him a more lengthy stint behind bars. Brent opts to join the army rather than go to prison, but he and Harlow continue a long distance relationship, to Paul's frustration. He matchmakes Harlow with Lassiter's employee Jesse Porter (Cameron Robbie) and is delighted when Harlow breaks up with Brent for Jesse. However, Harlow later confesses to Paul that she has faked her romance with Jesse to cover up that she is really still dating Brent, and she has since discovered that Jesse is the son of Julie Quill. Paul insists they hide Jesse's true identity to protect Terese and he feeds Jesse false information to sabotage the Quills. When Terese discovers that Jesse is the son of the woman responsible for her son Josh's death, she fires him from Lassiter's and berates Paul for keeping secrets from her. Paul later works with David to drive Jesse out of Erinsborough after becoming concerned that Terese has an unhealthy obsession with him due to similarities he shares with Josh. With Nicolette now heavily pregnant with David and Aaron's child, their surrogacy arrangement is thrown into jeopardy when it seems Chloe, her fiancée, has had a one-night stand with Leo, who has recently returned to Erinsborough. Paul warns Nicolette to honour the surrogacy agreement and then remove herself from David and Aaron's lives, but his actions push Nicolette to abscond from Erinsborough just weeks before her due date. Paul uses a private investigator to track Nicolette to Canberra, where he pays her a million dollars to hand over her newborn daughter, Isla (Axelle Austin; also Finn). She gives him the baby, which he brings back to a relieved David and Aaron. However, weeks later, Nicolette returns to Erinsborough with the real Isla, revealing that David and Aaron have been raising Abigail Tanaka (Mary Finn), the daughter of Leo and Britney Barnes (Montana Cox). Nicolette gave Abigail to Paul as Britney was suffering from severe postpartum depression and was unable to care for her daughter. Terese is furious to discover that Paul gave Nicolette a million dollars, and the revelation that Paul and David forced Jesse out of Erinsborough is the final straw for their marriage. She separates from Paul and he moves back into the Lassiter's penthouse alone.

Paul repeatedly appeals for Terese's forgiveness but she keeps her distance. Lucy forces them to present together at a Lassiter's conference in Queensland, where Paul is shocked to be reunited with his brother Glen. Glen gives him a frosty reception and initially rejects Paul's appeal for reconciliation, but later arrives in Erinsborough and makes a truce with Paul. Paul is frustrated by Harlow's suspicion of Glen and berates her for hiring John Wong to look into his background. Paul is injured by falling debris in a storm and Terese moves back into the penthouse to aid his recovery. They share a kiss but Terese admits she has romantic feelings for Glen. Not wanting Terese to move back out, Paul lies that he is not getting better and hires a crooked doctor to give him a fake diagnosis. Terese agrees to reconcile with Paul and they plan to renew their wedding vows, but on the day of the ceremony Paul's lies are exposed and she ends their relationship for good. Paul asks Glen to promise he will not pursue a romantic relationship with Terese, but when Paul manipulatively exposes that Kiri Durant (Gemma Bird Matheson) is Glen's biological daughter, Glen is infuriated with his betrayal and has sex with Terese. Angered by his brother and wife's new relationship, Paul pursues an aggressive divorce settlement from Terese. He discovers that Montana Marcel (Tammin Sursok), a fashion designer that is holding her fashion week at Lassiters, is on the verge of bankruptcy, but insists she continues to up the costs on her event in the knowledge that Terese's reputation will be tarnished by Montana's collapse. When Montana is arrested mid-fashion week, Terese takes the blame and Lucy fires her for her role in the disaster. Paul's glee is short-lived when he is left to manage Lassiter's in Terese's absence.

Paul visits New York and when he returns, Terese becomes suspicious that he is attempting to hide his assets from their divorce settlement. He is devastated when David is sent to prison and attempts to pay Holden to protect his son, but Holden instead aggravates an attack on David to get revenge on Paul. With David's situation putting life into perspective, Paul offers Terese a generous settlement and she agrees he can buy her out of Lassiter's. David is eventually released from prison, much to Paul's relief. Paul is reunited with his childhood friend and neighbour Shane Ramsay (Peter O'Brien), who offers to become Paul's partner in the hotel. Various warnings from Jane, Leo and Tim Collins make Shane wary of going into business with Paul and he instead asks to buy the hotel outright. Leo arranges for Paul to video call with Elle, Andrew and Amy, who all encourage him to move to New York to be closer to them. Paul decides to accept and agrees to sell Lassiter's to Shane. Terese breaks up with Glen and tries to kiss Paul, but he backs away, until the two talk and rekindle their marriage. Shane decides to go back to the original deal and Paul stays in Erinsborough with Terese and his children. Paul attends Toadie and Melanie's wedding and goes to their Ramsay Street reception, where he sees Scott and Charlene return.

Reception

Dennis has earned various award nominations for his role as Paul. At the 2007 Inside Soap Awards, Dennis was nominated for Best Actor and Best Bad Boy. The following year, Dennis was again nominated for Best Actor and Best Bad Boy. At the first Digital Spy Soap Awards ceremony in 2008, Dennis was nominated for Villain of the Year. 2009 saw Dennis nominated for Best Actor and Best Bad Boy at the Inside Soap Awards once again. In 2010, Dennis was nominated for the very first Best Daytime Star award. He received a nomination in the same category in 2015 and 2017. He progressed to the viewer-voted shortlist in 2017, but lost out to Lorna Laidlaw, who portrays Mrs Tembe on Doctors. Dennis was nominated for Best Soap Actor (Male) at the 2018 Digital Spy Reader Awards; he came in joint ninth place with 3.9% of the total votes. In 2020, Dennis won Best Daytime Star at the Inside Soap Awards. He won the same award in 2022.

Paul was placed at number number one on the Huffpost's "35 greatest Neighbours characters of all time" feature. Journalist Adam Beresford branded him as "the lothario of Lassiters", one of soap opera's most married men and "the scoundrel that Neighbours viewers absolutely love to hate." He is also labelled "ruthless" and the way he "tramples" on other characters, Beresford gushed that Paul "does it with such relish that you can't help but enjoy his schemes, no matter how extreme." Beresford initially thought Paul to be a "pretty quiet, decent young man" until Terry set him off on "the road to villainy". He concluded that "Paul has done it all over the years" and the show was unimaginable without him. In 2022, Kate Randall from Heat included Paul in the magazine's top ten Neighbours characters of all time feature. Randall stated "from ep one, we've loved to hate the Lassiters ladies' man. Married six times, ruthless Paul burned down his business, laundered money, became a fugitive, and only started being nice briefly because of a brain tumour." Paul was placed second in a poll ran via soap fansite "Back To The Bay", which asked readers to determine the top ten most popular Neighbours characters. The Daily Mirror's Susan Knox added that Paul is a "legendary character". In a feature profiling the "top 12 iconic Neighbours characters", critic Sheena McGinley of the Irish Independent placed Paulk third on her list. She stated that "every soap needs a loveable rogue" like Paul and compared him to the Coronation Street character Mike Baldwin (Johnny Briggs). That year, Paul was also featured on a list of "favourite Neighbours characters of all time", which was compiled by Lorna White from Yours magazine.

A reporter from Virgin Media branded the character a "retro soap hunk." They branded him a "bad boy" who is "motivated by greed and lust, Paul manipulated his way into business and into the ladies' beds (even with a dodgy earring). Watch out ladies..." Virgin Media also ran a feature profiling their twenty-five most memorable television comebacks, amongst them was Paul's 2004 return and they said "ruthless 'workaholic' businessman Paul Robinson fled Australia in 1993 to escape fraud charges only to return more sinister than ever in 2005 to burn down the Lassiter's hotel complex." Holy Soap have said that Paul starting the Lassiter's fire and killing Gus during his 2004 return, was one of soap opera's greatest comebacks. They also branded him a "legendary figure" of Neighbours. Josephine Monroe in her book Neighbours: The first 10 years, names Paul one of soap opera's most enduring characters.

In 2010, to celebrate Neighbours' 25th anniversary, British satellite broadcasting company, Sky UK, profiled twenty-five characters of which they believed were the most memorable in the series history. Paul is in the list and joke about his many wives stating: "How many of Paul's five wives can you name? No points for current wife Rebecca, ten for naming Lynn, Gail, or Christina Alessi, and 1,400 points for remembering first wife, plumber Terry [...] Yes, Paul's been around the block." They also branded him as the reason Neighbours, in their opinion was good viewing in the 2000s adding: "It's his cackling soap villain role that we love to hate him for: his return in 2004, torching Lassiter's and befriending Dylan, marked the start of Neighbours getting awesome in the mid-noughties. Although it's probably safe to say that period was over by the time he suffered amnesia of everything after 1989." He has also been branded as a "legend character". Andrew Mercado, author of Super Aussie Soaps, describes Paul as being very similar to fictional character J. R. Ewing. In 2016, Victoria Wilson of What's On TV called Paul "one of soaps all-time biggest baddies!" and compiled a list of the top ten "scandals" he had been involved in.

Entertainment reporting website Last Broadcast praised Paul's development, stating: "As the kind of shady character who'd do anything to make a fast buck, he even planned to bulldoze Ramsay Street to make way for a new supermarket development. And that's not all: fraud, blackmail, murder; there is no level to which Paul wouldn't have sunk. Yet, the infamous bad boy of Erinsborough, has, thankfully, turned over a new leaf." In her 2007 book, It's Not My Fault They Print Them, Catherine Deveny slates Paul and Dennis' acting ability stating: "Stefan Dennis as the mustache-twirling panto villain Paul Robinson, is a genius. I just wanted to yell out 'He's behind you, he's behind you!' It takes sheer brilliance to be able to act that badly". Similarly, Paul Kalina of The Age said Dennis as Paul lightens things up and he prances about like "a pantomime villain minus the moustache and cape." But Kalina believed "Erinsborough just would not be the same without him." The character receives a mention in Emily Barr's fictitious novel Out of My Depth, in which character Amanda is watching Neighbours, with scenes featuring Paul and Gail receiving disapproval from Harold, Amanda opines that she believes the couple are in love.

The character's reputation with women and his various romances and marriages have often drawn commentary from critics. Ruth Deller of entertainment website Lowculture commented on Paul stating: "He's always been a bit of a ladies' man and has had an eye for a business deal and has always struggled with whether to be good Paul or bad Paul. Ramsay Street's most prolific marry-er and father-er." She also criticises the fact Paul's false leg is never shown on-screen adding: "Paul has a wooden leg, which sometimes causes him to limp, when he remembers about it." An Inside Soap writer opined that "slimy seducer" Paul remained the same "eighties smooth operator", observing "he's certainly not short of a slick chat-up line or two. He's as skilled a lothario now as he always was." A TVTimes columnist stated "He's no Brad Pitt and he's a devious beggar at the best of times, but Paul Robinson doesn't half get the ladies." While a reporter for the Evening Gazette observed, "When you've had a fling with just about every woman in Erinsborough, like Paul Robinson, it was inevitable that old flames would pop up at some point."

References

Bibliography

External links
 Paul Robinson at the Official AU Neighbours website
 Paul Robinson at the Official UK Neighbours'' website

Fictional amputees
Fictional businesspeople
Fictional flight attendants
Fictional fraudsters
Fictional murderers
Fictional reporters
Fictional schoolteachers
Fictional hoteliers
Male villains
Television characters introduced in 1985
Fictional mayors
Fictional newspaper editors
Male characters in television
Neighbours characters
Robinson family (Neighbours)
Fictional prisoners and detainees